Dresden From the Right Bank of the Elbe Below the Augustus Bridge is an oil on canvas by the Italian urban landscape painter Bernardo Bellotto. Painted in 1748, it depicts the view of Dresden from the right bank of the River Elbe, including the Dresden Frauenkirche, the Dresden Cathedral, and the Augustus Bridge. One year earlier, he painted another piece titled Dresden From the Right Bank of the Elbe Above the Augustus Bridge, looking in the other direction from above the Augustus Bridge. Both of the paintings are in the permanent collection of the Gemäldegalerie Alte Meister. The paintings have proved invaluable in rebuilding parts of the city that were destroyed during the World War II.

Lists of replicas
Between 1751 and 1753, Bellotto also executed smaller replicas of the two paintings. There are some other replicas from his own hand.

 Dresden From the Right Bank of the Elbe Below the Augustus Bridge, ca. 1750, National Gallery of Ireland.
 Dresden From the Right Bank of the Elbe Below the Augustus Bridge, Private Collection (Madrid).
 Dresden From the Right Bank of the Elbe Below the Augustus Bridge, 1751–53, Gemäldegalerie Alte Meister.

Gallery

See also
 Bombing of Dresden in World War II

References

1748 paintings
Collections of the Gemäldegalerie Alte Meister
Paintings by Bernardo Bellotto
Churches in art
Ships in art